John Carl 'Jack' Button (1940 – July 31, 1996) was a professional hockey executive with the Pittsburgh Penguins and Washington Capitals of the National Hockey League. The Jack Button Award, given to the top prospect for the Washington Capitals, was created in his honor. He died of leukemia in 1996.

NHL clubs
Button served as an assistant general manager while with the Penguins from 1969 until 1974, when he was named as the franchise's third general manager. At the end of the 1974-75 season, the Penguins entered bankruptcy. The new owners included Wren Blair as a minority partner, who took over the managerial reins. In Washington, Button was highly regarded as a scout and he was credited with discovering Peter Bondra, Jim Carey, Sergei Gonchar, Michal Pivonka and Brendan Witt. He was a part of the Capital franchise from 1979 until his death in 1996. During the 1996–97 season, the Capitals wore a memorial patch for Button which showcased his initials and a bulldog.

Minor league clubs
Button was public relations director of the Rochester Americans from 1964 until 1966, then moved to the American Hockey League office as the league's PR director. He also served as league secretary. In 1968, the Pittsburgh Penguins appointed him general manager of their Central Hockey League affiliate, the Amarillo Wranglers. The club played only one season, after which Button was promoted to the Penguins' front office.

League work
Button founded the NHL Central Scouting Bureau and served as its first director from 1975 until 1979.

Family
Jack is the father of Craig Button, a former executive with the Dallas Stars and Calgary Flames, as well as a former pro scout with the Toronto Maple Leafs. His other son Tod is the Flames' current director of scouting.

References

A to Z Hockey" Jack Button

1940 births
1996 deaths
American ice hockey coaches
People from Rushville, New York
Pittsburgh Penguins executives
Washington Capitals executives
Washington Capitals scouts
Deaths from leukemia
Deaths from cancer in Washington, D.C.